Law Center can refer to:

Advocacy organizations
 Southern Poverty Law Center
 Giffords Law Center to Prevent Gun Violence
 National Consumer Law Center
 Software Freedom Law Center

Schools
 Georgetown University Law Center
 Touro Law Center
 University of Houston Law Center
 Franklin Pierce Law Center, now known as University of New Hampshire School of Law
 Southern University Law Center

Law firms
 Thomas More Law Center
 Juvenile Law Center